Graham Greene (1904–1991) was a leading English novelist of the 20th century.

Graham Greene may also refer to:
 Graham Greene (actor) (born 1952), Canadian actor
 Sir William Graham Greene (18571950), senior British civil servant
 Graham C. Greene (19362016), British publisher